Ronald Sinclair (21 January 1924 – 22 November 1992), born Richard Arthur Hould and sometimes credited as Ra Hould or Ron Sinclair, was a child actor from New Zealand, turned film editor.

Early years
Sinclair was the son of Arthur Hould and Amy Beatrice Hould.

Early career
Sinclair was a juvenile player turned film editor who retained his celebrity in his native New Zealand long after the end of his Hollywood acting career. Sinclair's feature credits include William Wellman's The Light That Failed, Tower of London, Alexander Korda's That Hamilton Woman, Raoul Walsh's Desperate Journey, and Thoroughbreds Don't Cry with Mickey Rooney and Judy Garland. He also appeared in a series of children's adventure films featuring the Five Little Peppers.
Sinclair also starred in the 1938 adaptation of Charles Dickens' A Christmas Carol, starring Reginald Owen. He played young Scrooge.

Late career
He served as a soldier during World War II.
After that, he resumed work in 1955, and began a long, fruitful collaboration with producer-director Roger Corman, which led to a busy career in low-budget independent filmmaking. Sinclair edited Corman's directorial debut, Swamp Women, and went on to work on at least a dozen of Corman's other films including Day the World Ended, The Intruder, Thunder Alley, The Raven and The Trip. He also edited a number of films by another low-rent auteur with big ideas, Bert I. Gordon: The Amazing Colossal Man, Invasion of the Saucer Men, War of the Colossal Beast, Attack of the Puppet People, and The Spider.

He was also the President of the California Branch of the Humane Society of the United States. Sinclair died from respiratory failure at the Motion Picture & Television County Home on 22 November 1992. He was cremated and his ashes were scattered.  He was survived by his wife, Carol, and son, Richard.

Filmography

References

External links

1924 births
1992 deaths
New Zealand male film actors
New Zealand film editors
Actors from Dunedin
20th-century New Zealand male actors
New Zealand emigrants to the United States